Alucita mesolychna is a moth of the family Alucitidae. It is found in Sri Lanka and India (Assam).

References

Moths described in 1907
Alucitidae
Moths of Asia
Moths of Sri Lanka
Taxa named by Edward Meyrick